Otho of Saint Omer was the lord of half of Thebes in Frankish Greece from 1294 to ca. 1299.

He was a younger son of Bela of Saint Omer and Bonne de la Roche, sister of the Lord of Athens and Thebes, Guy I de la Roche. Upon their marriage, in 1240, Guy gave Bela the lordship over half of Thebes. Otho participated, along with his brothers Nicholas II and John, in the War of the Euboeote Succession in the ranks of the coalition of most of the princes of Frankish Greece, who opposed the expansionist policies of the Prince of Achaea, William II of Villehardouin.

Otho was married to Margarita da Verona. After Nicholas II's death in 1294, he succeeded him as lord of one half of Thebes until his own death, sometime before 1299.

References

Sources
  
 

13th-century births
1290s deaths
13th-century rulers in Europe
People from the Duchy of Athens
Year of birth unknown
Medieval Thebes
Saint-Omer family